Samuel Sharon Farr (born July 4, 1941) is an American politician who was the U.S. representative for California's 17th (1993–2013) and 20th congressional districts (2013–17). He is a member of the Democratic Party. He was elected to Congress in a 1993 special election when longtime Democratic Rep. Leon Panetta resigned to become Director of the Office of Management and Budget. On November 12, 2015, he announced his retirement from Congress after the 2016 elections.

Early life and education 
Farr was born in San Francisco, the son of Janet E. (née Haskins) and Frederick Sharon "Fred" Farr. One of his maternal great-grandfathers was acting mayor of Los Angeles William Hartshorn Bonsall, and one of his paternal great-great-grandfathers was the brother of Nevada Senator William Sharon. He grew up in Carmel, where he still lives. His father was a California state senator from 1955 to 1967.

Farr was educated at Willamette University, Santa Clara University and the Monterey Institute of International Studies. He is a member of the Sigma Chi fraternity from Willamette University.

Early career

Peace Corps service
Farr joined the Peace Corps in 1964 and served for two years as a volunteer in Colombia. He spent his time in a poor barrio near Medellin, teaching community development skills.

While he was serving in Colombia, Farr's mother died from cancer. Following her death, his father visited with Farr's sisters. While riding horses, one of his sisters (Nancy), was thrown and hit her head. She died on the operating table in a Colombian hospital.

Since his Peace Corps service ended, Farr has visited Colombia often. He went there for his honeymoon and has returned several other times for both personal and official business. During a trip in 2007, Farr spoke in front of the Colombian Congress and was awarded the Orden del Congreso de Colombia.

State and local political career
Farr's public service career began in the California Assembly, where he worked as a staffer on budget issues for a decade. In 1975, he ran for and won a seat on the Monterey County Board of Supervisors.

In 1980 he was elected to the California State Assembly, where he became a champion for the organics industry and wrote one of the country's strictest oil spill liability laws. He served in the Assembly until his election to Congress in 1993.

U.S. House of Representatives

Farr was elected to the House of Representatives in 1993 through a special election when former Congressman Leon Panetta resigned to become President Clinton's budget director, defeating Republican Bill McCampbell with 52 percent of the vote. Farr was elected to his first full term in 1994, defeating McCampbell again with 52 percent of the vote. Both contests were the closest in the district since Panetta claimed the seat for the Democrats in 1977, and to date are the only times since then that a Republican has crossed the 40 percent mark. The district quickly reverted to form, and Farr was reelected ten more times with no substantive opposition, never dropping below 64 percent of the vote.

Legislation
Farr introduced the "Oceans Conservation, Education, and National Strategy for the 21st century Act" (H.R. 21 ) in January 2007. The bill would consolidate national management of oceans, creating a system of regional governance; make the National Oceanic and Atmospheric Administration the chief oceans agency; creates an ocean advisor in the president's Cabinet; creates regional and national ocean advisory committees; and create an Oceans and Great Lakes Conservation Trust Fund. It received a subcommittee markup in April 2008 and passed by a vote of 11–3.
Farr's "Reconstruction and Stabilization Civilian Management Act of 2008" (H.R. 1084 ) was approved by the House but stalled in the Senate. The bill would create capacity within the State Department to quickly deploy civilian expertise and coordinate the government response to crises abroad. President [George W. Bush] supports the program and approved initial creation of the group. Farr participated in a rollout of the group with Secretary of State Condoleezza Rice in July 2008.

Caucus work
 Farr is active in several congressional caucuses, including the House Oceans Caucus, the Congressional Travel and Tourism Caucus, the Congressional Bike Caucus, the Congressional Organic Caucus, the International Conservation Caucus, and the Unexploded Ordnance Caucus.

He serves as co-chair of the Congressional Travel and Tourism Caucus with Rep. Gus Bilirakis (R-Florida). Farr has taken an active role in supporting the travel industry, boosting membership in the caucus to more than 100 and hosting caucus events, including a June 2008 gathering of travel executives and congressional leaders, the Economic Roundtable: Travel's Significance to the U.S. Economy.

Farr is also active as co-chair of the House Oceans Caucus, which he co-chairs with four other members of Congress. Each year the caucus helps sponsor Capitol Hill Oceans Week, known as CHOW, which draws hundreds of ocean experts from across the country. He is also co-chair of the Congressional Organic Caucus and the Unexploded Ordnance Caucus.

Other leadership positions
Farr serves on the House Democracy Assistance Commission, a group established by the House of Representatives mandated to work with emerging democracies throughout the world. The group engages in "peer-to-peer cooperation to build technical expertise in partner legislatures that will enhance accountability, transparency, legislative independence, access to information, and government oversight."

Farr is also the former chairman of the California Democratic Congressional Delegation, the largest state delegation in Congress.

Committee assignments
Committee on Appropriations
Subcommittee on Agriculture, Rural Development, Food and Drug Administration, and Related Agencies (Ranking Member)
Subcommittee on Military Construction, Veterans Affairs, and Related Agencies

Political positions
Farr was one of the 31 who voted in the House to not count the electoral votes from Ohio in the 2004 presidential election.
Farr opposed the USA PATRIOT Act and is pro-choice. He received a 91% progressive rating by Progressive Punch, ranking him the 42nd most progressive member of congress.
He took a leadership role for the House Democrats in opposing the Central American Free Trade Agreement because he did not think it had good environmental and worker protections.
Rep. Farr voted against the invasion of Iraq and was actively against the Iraq War.
He voted for the $700 billion Emergency Economic Stabilization Act of 2008.
He received a perfect 100% rating for the 110th, 111th, and 112th United States Congress from the Human Rights Campaign.

Domestic issues

Oceans. Farr is a proponent of ocean protection and conservation. In addition to H.R. 21, Farr has introduced the Southern Sea Otter Recovery and Research Act (H.R. 3639) and the Clean Cruise Ship Act (H.R. 6434 ).
Gas prices. Farr also supports ending subsidies to oil companies.
Base Realignment and Closure. Farr has worked closely with Central Coast cities and the Army on the reuse of the former Fort Ord. He was integral in securing $29 million for the creation of California State University-Monterey Bay. He also played a role in making sure land on the former installation included significant amounts of affordable housing.
Immigration. Farr supports comprehensive immigration reform that includes a guest worker program for farm workers, allowing undocumented students to remain in the country (known as the DREAM Act), and deporting undocumented felons in U.S. jails.

Foreign Affairs

Iraq. Farr has consistently opposed the war in Iraq. He voted against the "Authorization for Use of Military Force Against Iraq Resolution of 2002" that started the war. Farr is a cosponsor on several bills including H.Res. 1329 , which supports a timetable for troop withdrawal, and H.R. 5626  and H.R 4959 , which call for congressional approval for any long-term agreements with Iraq.
Iran. Farr has been vocal in efforts to prevent military action against Iran. He is a cosponsor of H. Con. Res 33, which would require congressional approval before any incursion into Iran, and H.R. 3119 , a bill to prohibit the use of funds for military operations in Iran.
Colombia. Farr has parlayed his experience in Colombia to become a congressional leader on Colombian affairs. He was an active supporter of rebalancing funds dedicated to Plan Colombia, the U.S. anti-drug effort, to include more support for economic redevelopment efforts. He has hosted a wide range of Colombian political leaders in his Washington office including current President Álvaro Uribe and former President Andrés Pastrana.

Immigration and Customs Enforcement (ICE) comment
On February 26, 2008, at the House Homeland Security Appropriations Subcommittee hearing, Farr said "the public image of (the ICE agents)" has become "not (a) compassionate law enforcement agency but essentially a Gestapo-type agency that is knocking down doors" when conducting raids on illegal immigrants. Immigration and Customs Enforcement Julie Myers responded to Farr's comments by saying, "We are not the Gestapo. The men and women of this agency have a very difficult job...and I think they do that with distinction and great honor.". Farr replied that he knew and appreciated this, but reiterated that there is "there is a very ill will public opinion in the counties (he) represent(s), about ICE".

H.Res. 333

On July 12, 2007, Farr joined 11 cosponsors of H.Res. 333, introduced in Congress, that lays out three articles of impeachment against Vice President Dick Cheney. The bill maintains that the vice president purposely manipulated the intelligence process to deceive the citizens and Congress of the United States (1) by fabricating a threat of Iraqi weapons of mass destruction and (2) about an alleged relationship between Iraq and al Qaeda in order to justify the use of the United States Armed Forces against the nation of Iraq in a manner damaging to our national security interests and (3) that Cheney has openly threatened aggression against the Republic of Iran absent any real threat to the United States.

"Many residents in the Central Coast support the removal of Cheney from office, and I am proud to represent their values in Congress," Farr said in a brief statement.

Awards
On July 30, 2007, Farr received the Senator David Pryor Special Achievement Award for his ongoing advocacy for communities with military bases presented by the Association of Defense Communities. The award is given to an individual who advocates for communities with active or closed military bases. "Communities with active or closed military bases face many special concerns, from land use to economic development to ordnance disposal," said Farr. "I have been lucky enough to assist in the transition efforts at Fort Ord, and that experience has helped me push those issues locally and nationwide." As vice-chair of the House Appropriations Subcommittee on Military Construction, Farr successfully increased clean-up funds from $221 million to $271 million for military bases closed prior to 2005.

Personal life 
He is married to Shary and has one daughter, Jessica.

Electoral history

References

External links

 
Profile at SourceWatch
Biography from the Peace Corps
Sam Farr’s Plan for Ties with Cuba from the Havana Times

1941 births
Living people
Democratic Party members of the United States House of Representatives from California
Democratic Party members of the California State Assembly
Peace Corps volunteers
Episcopalians from California
Willamette University alumni
Santa Clara University alumni
American expatriates in Colombia
People from San Francisco
People from Carmel-by-the-Sea, California
21st-century American politicians